Henry Weaver House, a California Bungalow, is in Santa Monica, California. It was built in 1910 by the Milwaukee Building Company for Henry Weaver, a Midwestern hotel developer.  The house's broad roof overhang, prominent front porch and emphasis on natural colors and materials are unique features of the American Craftsman California Bungalow Style, which "fit the Southland landscape, Southland climate and Southland temperament," according to a 1910 Los Angeles Times article on the Weaver house.

Restoration of the house began in 1985, and the house was listed in the National Register of Historic Places in 1989.  

In Los Angeles: An Architectural Guide, David Gebhard and Robert Winter describe it as “A gorgeous example of Craftsman orientalism, worthy of Charles and Henry Greene.”

References

External links

 Santa Monica Landmarks: Henry Weaver House

American Craftsman architecture in California
Buildings and structures in Santa Monica, California
Bungalow architecture in California
Houses completed in 1910
Houses in Los Angeles County, California
Houses on the National Register of Historic Places in California
Landmarks in Santa Monica, California
Buildings and structures on the National Register of Historic Places in Los Angeles County, California